Glipa alboscutellata is a species of beetle in the genus Glipa. It was described in 1934.

References

alboscutellata
Beetles described in 1934
Taxa named by Hiromichi Kono